Esslemont is a surname. Notable people with the surname include:
Anna Esslemont, Welsh folk musician, member of Uiscedwr
George Birnie Esslemont (1860-1917), British politician
Ian Cameron Esslemont (born 1962), Canadian writer
John Esslemont (1874-1925), Scottish Bahá'í
Mary Esslemont (1891-1984), Scottish doctor
Peter Esslemont (1834-1894), Scottish politician
Sonny Esslemont (born 1993), Scottish rugby player